Huishu is a Tangkhulic language spoken in Huishu village, Ukhrul District, Manipur, India (Mortensen 2004).

References

Mortensen, David R. (2004). “The emergence of dorsal stops after high vowels in Huishu.” In Proceedings of the 30th Annual Meeting of the Berkeley Linguistics Society. (handout)
Mortensen, David R. and James A. Miller (2013). “A reconstruction of Proto-Tangkhulic rhymes.” Linguistics of the Tibeto-Burman Area 36(1): 1-32.
Mortensen, David R. (2012). Database of Tangkhulic Languages. (unpublished ms. contributed to STEDT).
Mortensen, David R. and James A. Miller (2009). “Proto-Tangkhul Onsets in Comparative Perspective.” International Conference on Sino-Tibetan Languages and Linguistics 42, Chiangmai, November 4. 
Mortensen, David R. (2003). “Comparative Tangkhul.” Unpublished Qualifying Paper, UC Berkeley.
Mortensen, David. 2014. The Tangkhulic Tongues - How I Started Working on Endangered Languages.

Tangkhulic languages